Farma 8 (The Farm 8) is the 8th season of the Slovak version of The Farm reality television show based on the Swedish television series of the same name. The show was filmed from February 2017 to June 2017 and premiered on March 9, 2017 on Markíza.

Format
Twelve contestants are chosen from the outside world. Each week one contestant is selected the Farmer of the Week. In the first week, the contestants choose the Farmer. Since week 2, the Farmer is chosen by the contestant evicted in the previous week.

Nomination process
The Farmer of the Week nominates two people (a man and a woman) as the Butlers. The others must decide which Butler is the first to go to the Battle. That person then chooses the second person (from the same sex) for the Battle and also the type of battle (a quiz, extrusion, endurance, sleight). The Battle winner must win two duels. The Battle loser is evicted from the game.

Ages stated are at time of contest.

Nominations

The game

External links

The Farm (franchise)
2017 Slovak television seasons